Kader Khan  (22 October 1937 – 31 December 2018) was an Indian actor, screenwriter and film director. As an actor, he appeared in over 300 Bollywood films after his debut film in the 1973 film Daag, starring Rajesh Khanna, in which he acted as a prosecuting attorney. He was a prolific actor and screenwriter in Hindi cinema in the period late 1970s to 90s and wrote dialogues for 200 films. Khan graduated from Ismail Yusuf College affiliated to Bombay University. Before entering the film industry in the early 1970s, he taught at M. H. Saboo Siddik College of Engineering, Mumbai, as a professor of civil engineering.

Early life and education
Kader Khan was born in Kabul, Afghanistan, on 22 October 1937 into a Sunni Muslim family. His father was Abdul Rahman Khan from Kandahar, Afghanistan while his mother was Iqbal Begum from Pishin in the Baluchistan Province of British India (now in Balochistan, Pakistan). Khan had three brothers, Shams ur Rehman, Fazal Rehman and Habib ur Rehman. He is an ethnic Pashtun of the Kakar tribe. Khan was raised in the Kamathipura neighbourhood of Mumbai after his family moved there from Kabul. He enrolled in a local municipal school and later in the Ismail Yusuf College after which he graduated in Engineering specializing in Civil engineering. Between 1970 and 1975, he taught at M. H. Saboo Siddik College of Engineering in Byculla as a professor of civil engineering.
While performing in a play named Taash Ke Patey, he was noted by comedian Agha who then suggested actor Dilip Kumar to see the play. Dilip Kumar was impressed and signed him up for his next films, Sagina and Bairaag. During an interview to Rediff, Khan recalled this as the incident that started his film career. He used to write plays for theatres and was subsequently offered to write the script of Jawani Diwani, which started his career as a script writer.

His career as a Hindi film writer began when Narinder Bedi saw the theatre play Khan had written and asked him to co-write the script for Jawani Diwani with Inder Raj Anand, for which Khan received 1500 rupees.

Career

Actor
Khan acted in over 300 films in Hindi and Urdu and wrote dialogue for over 250 Indian films, from the 1970s up to the turn of the 21st century. At the insistence of Rajesh Khanna, Manmohan Desai paid him the high amount of one lakh twenty-one thousand for writing dialogue for the film Roti (1974), which was produced by Khanna himself.

He was most popularly recognized for working with actors Amitabh Bachchan, Rajesh Khanna, Jeetendra, Feroz Khan, Mithun Chakraborty, Anil Kapoor, Govinda and in films directed by T. Rama Rao, K. Raghavendra Rao, K. Bapaiah, Narayana Rao Dasari, David Dhawan. He has worked side by side with other comedians like Asrani, Shakti Kapoor and Johnny Lever. He has co-starred with Amrish Puri, Prem Chopra, Amjad Khan and Anupam Kher in many films. He has played a large variety of parts in different genre of films like comedy, action, romance, family, social and political.

Khan made his debut with Daag, starring Rajesh Khanna in the main lead role, wherein Khan played the supporting role as an advocate. He subsequently starred as supporting artist with roles in Dil Diwana, Muqaddar Ka Sikandar and Mr. Natwarlal. 

He also started getting lengthy roles as supporting actor after 1984, with films like Masterji, Dharm Adhikari, Nasihat, Dosti Dushmani, Ghar Sansar, Loha, Insaniyat Ke Dushman, Insaf Ki Pukar, Khudgarz, Sherni, Khoon Bhari Maang, Sone Pe Suhaaga and Vardi. From 1988, there were films written with him in main lead, like Karz Chukana Hai, Jaisi Karni Waisi Bharnii, Biwi Ho To Aisi, Ghar Ho To Aisa, Hum Hain Kamaal Ke and Baap Numbri Beta Dus Numbri.

His first attempt at comedy was with Himmatwala and Aaj Ka Daur. He started doing main comedy roles from 1989 onwards, with films like Kishen Kanhaiya, Hum, Ghar Parivar, Bol Radha Bol and continued through the nineties with comedy roles in Aankhen, Taqdeerwala, Main Khiladi Tu Anari, Dulhe Raja, Coolie No. 1, Saajan Chale Sasural, Sooryavansham, Judaai, Aunty No. 1, Bade Miyan Chote Miyan, Raja Babu, Khuddar, Chhote Sarkar, Gharwali Baharwali, Hero Hindustani, Sirf Tum and Anari No. 1. Even in early 2000s, he attempted versatile roles with films like Akhiyon Se Goli Maare, Chalo Ishq Ladaaye, Suno Sasurjee, Yeh Hai Jalwa and Mujhse Shaadi Karogi. His work as a comedian was notable in Himmatwala, Aankhen and Coolie No. 1.

He starred in his own comedy television series titled Hasna Mat (literally: Don't laugh), which aired on Star Plus in 2001. He made a comeback on Indian television with a comedy series Hi! Padosi... Kaun Hai Doshi? on Sahara One.

He later appeared in Lucky: No Time for Love (2006) and Family: Ties of Blood (2006).

Screenwriter
This was Rajesh Khanna who gave him the break as dialogue writer in his film Roti and thereafter he wrote dialogues for films with Rajesh Khanna in the lead like Maha Chor, Chhailla Babu, Dharam Kanta, Fiffty Fiffty, Naya Kadam, Masterji, and Nasihat, all of which were hit films at the box office. Other successful films for which he has written or assisted in dialogues include films starring Jeetendra like Himmatwala, Jaani Dost, Sarfarosh, Justice Chaudhury, Farz Aur Kanoon, Jeeo Aur Jeene Do, Tohfa, Qaidi and Haisiyat.

As a screenwriter, Kader Khan has worked with Manmohan Desai and Prakash Mehra for their films starring Amitabh Bachchan. Besides Amitabh, he was the only one to work in the rival camps of Mehra and Desai. His films with Desai include Dharam Veer, Gangaa Jamunaa Saraswati, Coolie, Desh Premee, Suhaag, Parvarish and Amar Akbar Anthony and films with Prakash Mehra include Jwalamukhi, Sharaabi, Lawaaris and Muqaddar Ka Sikandar.

Some of Amitabh Bachchan's films with popular dialogues and script were written by Khan. Some notable examples of these movies are Mr. Natwarlal, Khoon Pasina, Do Aur Do Paanch, Satte Pe Satta, Inquilab, Giraftaar, Hum and Agneepath. For the film Agneepath for Bachchan, had received the National Film Awards.

Khan was in demand by the South Indian film production houses such as Padmalaya. Major filmmakers of southern cinema such as Narayana Rao Dasari, K. Bapayya, K. Raghavendra Rao, T. Rama Rao, Dasari Narayan Rao, D. Rama Naidu consulted Khan for doing the script and dialogue of the Hindi remakes of their southern language films. Some of these films included Himmatwala (1983), Justice Chaudhury (1983), Haisiyat (1984) and Singhasan (1986). As reported in The Hindu, "He didn't just translate the original films into Hindi but transposed them into a new North setting, culture, context and language."

He was preferred dialogue writer for the Hindi films directed by K. Raghavendra Rao, Narayana Dasari Rao, K. Bapaiah and for films produced by D. Rama Naidu and K. C. Bokadia. He also wrote dialogues in other successful films in the late '80s to the late '90s like Meri Aawaz Suno, Angaar, Jail Yatra, Satte Pe Satta, Katilon Ke Kaatil, Waqt Ki Awaz, Coolie No. 1, Main Khiladi Tu Anari, Kanoon Apna Apna, Karma, Sultanat, Baap Numbri Beta Dus Numbri, Humshakal, Saajan Chale Sasural, Hero Hindustani, Aunty No. 1, and Rajaji. He also wrote dialogues for films of Rakesh Roshan like Khoon Bhari Maang, Kala Bazaar and Khudgarz.

Personal life
Khan lived in Mumbai, until moving to Toronto due to health reasons. He had three sons: Sarfaraz Khan, Shahnawaz Khan, and a third son Quddus who lived in Canada, died in 2021. His son Sarfaraz Khan has also acted in several films. It was reported that Khan took the citizenship of Canada. In 2014, Khan visited Mecca to perform Hajj.

Death
Khan had supranuclear palsy, a degenerative disease. He was hospitalized on 28 December 2018 complaining of "breathlessness" in Canada, where he stayed with his son and daughter-in-law while seeking treatment.  On 31 December 2018 (EST), Khan's son, Sarfaraz Khan, confirmed that Khan had died. His funeral ceremony was held at ISNA mosque in Mississauga, and he was buried in Brampton's Meadowvale Cemetery.

Awards and nominations

 2013: Sahitya Shiromani Award for his work and contributions to Hindi Film industry and Cinema.
 Khan was recognized twice by the AFMI (American Federation of Muslims from India) for his achievements and service to the Muslim community in India.
On 26 January 2019 Government of India announced to posthumously award Kader Khan Padma Shri.

Filmography

References

External links

 
 An interview with Kader Khan
 Kader Khan made Honorary Citizen of Houston

1937 births
2018 deaths
Pashtun people
Indian people of Afghan descent
Indian people of Pashtun descent
Afghan emigrants to India
Indian emigrants to Canada
Canadian people of Indian descent
Canadian people of Afghan descent
Canadian people of Pashtun descent
Canadian Muslims
People from Kabul
Male actors from Mumbai
Indian male film actors
Canadian male film actors
Filmfare Awards winners
Indian male comedians
Canadian male comedians
Osmania University alumni
Indian male screenwriters
Male actors in Hindi cinema
Ismail Yusuf College alumni
Film producers from Mumbai
Screenwriters from Mumbai
20th-century Indian male actors
21st-century Indian male actors
20th-century Indian dramatists and playwrights
20th-century Indian male writers
Recipients of the Padma Shri in arts
Screen Awards winners
Neurological disease deaths in Ontario
Deaths from progressive supranuclear palsy